The Muslim United Front (MUF) was a 'polyglot coalition' of Islamic Kashmiri political parties that contested the 1987 Jammu and Kashmir Legislative Assembly election in the erstwhile Indian state of Jammu and Kashmir. The Jamaat-e-Islami of Jammu and Kashmir was a key constituent party of the coalition. The MUF won four Assembly seats in the 1987 election. However, widespread rigging of the election by the ruling National Conference party was reported. In the absence of such rigging, commentators believe that it could have won fifteen to twenty seats, a contention admitted by the National Conference leader Farooq Abdullah.

The disaffection caused by the election gave rise to the Kashmir insurgency, which continues to this day.

The present day Hurriyat Conference is largely inspired by the former MUF coalition.

Background 
In 1986 the ruling National Conference, widely accused of corruption, came to an accord with Indian National Congress Party which threatened to erode what remained of Kashmir's autonomy. Moreover, the growing emphasis on secularism led to a backlash with Islamic parties becoming more popular. The key players among these parties were the Jamaat-e-Islami Kashmir and its student wing, Islami Jamiat-i Tulaba.

Formation of Muslim United Front 

In response to these issues was formed the MUF, which attracted support from separatists, youth and the pro-Pakistan Jamaat-e-Islami. MUF's election manifesto stressed the need to solve all outstanding issues according to the Simla Agreement, work for Islamic unity and against political interference from the centre. Their slogan in public rallies was wanting the law of the Quran in the Assembly.

The Islamic political coalition mobilized support on the basis of Kashmiriyat. The movement's grassroots campaign was said to be 'enthusiastically energetic', attracting youth activists who had been born in the 1960s. A Pandit activist recorded in her memoirs that there had been a 'wave' in favour of the MUF in early 1987 in the Valley.

1987 election and rigging 

The 1987 election witnessed the highest record of voters participation, with eighty per cent of the people in the Valley having voted.

The election of 1987 were considered to be the most compromised in the history of Jammu and Kashmir. Voting was held in the Valley on 23 March 1987 and a Delhi-based magazine reported that strong arms tactics and rigging were used all over the Valley and gangs took over the polling stations forcibly and ballot boxes were pre-stamped in favour of the National Conference.

The MUF won in only 4 of the 43 electoral constituencies it had contested, although it received a vote share of 31.9%. Scholar Victoria Schofield has stated that the MUF might have won four more seats if there was no electoral fraud. On the other hand, an anonymous source in the Intelligence Bureau has advanced the estimate that the MUF may have lost approximately 13 seats due to electoral malpractice.

Aftermath 
Instead of punishing those responsible for the rigging the Government arrested and tortured the MUF activists. According to Bose the number of activists arrested and tortured was in the hundreds and possibly thousands. Most of them were kept in custody until late 1987 or early 1988. Among those activists arrested was Yasin Malik and Mohammad Yusuf Shah.

Many younger supporters of MUF started to support the militant organisations which had up till the election seen a wane in their support and numerical strength. According to Maulana Abbas Ansari, a member of the Muslim United Front, the youth would have not picked up the gun nor have known of Nehru's promise of a plebiscite to the people of Kashmir had the election not been rigged.

Scholars see that the rise in the organisation's support caused the Congress-National Conference alliance to rig the 1987 election.

Notes

References

Bibliography

Further reading 
 
 Saima Bhat,  Battleground Amira Kadal, Kashmir Life, 24 March 2016.
 Abdul Razak Mir (Bachru), Kashmir Life, 24 March 2016.
 Mohammad Ismail Bhat, Kashmir Life, 24 March 2016.
 The Big Jama’at, Kashmir Life, 24 March 2016.
 
 MUF’s Mind, Kashmir Life, 24 March 2016.

State political parties in Jammu and Kashmir
Political parties established in 1986
Regionalist parties in India
1986 establishments in Jammu and Kashmir
Kashmir separatist movement